Karimabad (also Romanized as Karīmābād) is a village in Tankaman Rural District, Tankaman District, Nazarabad County, Alborz Province, Iran. At the 2006 census, its population was 262, in 70 families.

References 

Populated places in Nazarabad County